Boudabousia liubingyangii is a Gram-positive and non-spore-forming bacterium from the genus of Boudabousia which has been isolated from rectal swabs of the vultures Gypaetus barbatus.

References

Actinomycetales
Bacteria described in 2017